Fort Granville was a militia stockade located in the colonial Province of Pennsylvania.  Its site was about a mile from Lewistown, in what is now Granville Township, Mifflin County.  Active from 1755 until 1756, the stockade briefly sheltered pioneer settlers in the Juniata River valley during the French and Indian War.

Background
After the French victory in the Battle of the Monongahela on July 9, 1755, English settlers, who set up farms on Native American lands that they had illegally squatted on drew in hostilities from Native Americans. Native Americans who never legally ceded their land, resorted to hit-and-run tactics on the Pennsylvania frontier. The Native American tribes whose land was underhandedly sold by the Iroquois and the Province of Pennsylvania then entered in alliances with Native Americans from present-day Ohio. The underhanded doings of the English and the Iroquois led to the  Franco-Indian alliance with Native American Nations who distrusted the Iroquois, the British, and Pennsylvania. The Shawnee and Delaware sought to drive settlers off of land sold out from under the Shawnee by the British and Iroquois in western Pennsylvania. The provincial government of Pennsylvania decided that a string of forts should be constructed across the province from the Delaware Water Gap to the Maryland line. On December 17, 1755, Capt. George Croghan was issued the order below as signed by Benjamin Franklin, Joseph Fox, Joseph Hughs, and Evan Morgan:

Sir:—You are desired to proceed to Cumberland County and fix on proper places for erecting three stockades, viz.: One back of Patterson's, one upon Kishecoquillas, and one near Sideling Hill; each of them fifty feet square, with Block House on two of the corners, and a Barracks within, capable of lodging fifty men. You are also desired to agree with some proper Person or Persons to oversee the workmen at each Place, who shall be allowed such Wages as you shall agree to give, not exceeding one Dollar per day; and the workmen shall be allowed at the rate of six Dollars per month and their Provisions, till the work is finished.

Location and construction
Instead of constructing the fort at the mouth of the Kishacoquillas Creek, Croghan went up the Juniata River to a site near a spring. The exact location can no longer be determined, as the construction of the Pennsylvania Canal destroyed the spring around 1829. According to historian Walter O'Meara, "This fort was an important link in the chain of strongpoints on the west side of the Susquehanna [River], commanding the point where the Juniata falls through the mountains."

Military history

By the summer of 1756, the local settlers only left the fort when absolutely necessary due to an increase in the number of sightings of Native Americans intent on reclaiming their land. In 1754, the British and Iroquois had sold lands traditionally recognized as belonging to the Shawnee. In response, the Shawnee called on Indian allies from across the Ohio Valley. Delaware and Illinois warriors, along with a small group of French soldiers joined the Shawnee in their effort to drive off the new interlopers by attacking recently established farms. farms. By the summer of 1756, the combined Native American forces had driven most settlers in the area to Fort Granville. Assistance for the recent settlers arrived under the command of Lt. Armstrong with a militia force to protect them during the harvest. Some of this militia was sent south to Tuscarora to help the settlers there. Around July 22, some sixty to seventy Indian warriors -including Shawnee, Delaware, and Illinois - appeared outside the fort ready for battle, but the commanding officer declined to engage in hopes they would dissipate. The Native Americans fired at one man and wounded him but he was able to get back into the fort with no serious injury. A short distance from the river they killed a man named Baskins, burned his house, and took his wife and children captive. They also took Hugh Carrol and his family prisoners.

On July 30, Capt. Edward Ward, commandant at Fort Granville, took all but twenty-four men out of the fort to protect settlers in Sherman's Valley, leaving Lt. Edward Armstrong in command at the fort. The Native Americans ascertained the number left behind, and one hundred of them, along with fifty-five Frenchmen, led by Francois Coulon de Villiers—not his brother, Louis Coulon de Villiers, as is often written incorrectly—attacked the fort on August 2. "Most of the garrison was away, protecting harvesters in the vicinity; but a Lieutenant Armstrong and 24 men held off the attackers until the next morning."

About midnight, Coulon's men succeeded in setting Fort Granville on fire. Armstrong was shot while trying to extinguish the fire, and the French commander ordered a suspension of hostilities. Coulon offered quarter to the defenders for their surrender several times, but Armstrong would not surrender. He was later shot a second time and succumbed.

Shortly after Armstrong's death, Sergeant John Turner surrendered the fort, garrison, and civilians who had taken refuge inside the stockade.  The unfortunate sergeant was made an example of by the victors. They tied him to a stake and "after having heated several old gun barrels red-hot, they danced around him, and every minute or two, seared and burned his flesh... After tormenting him almost to death, they scalped him, and then held up a lad, who ended his sufferings by laying open his skull with a hatchet."  The death of Turner was due to a personal feud with an Indian whom he had had badly beaten at a previous time.  The captives were taken to Fort de Chartres in the Illinois country, where they were ransomed from the Indians by the French officers and local inhabitants.  Escorted to New Orleans, they were then repatriated to England and eventually returned to the American colonies.

Following orders from the French commander, Fort Granville was burnt by Captain Jacobs, leader of the Delaware participants. The French and Indian raid led to retaliation in the form of the Kittanning Expedition, led by Lt. Armstrong's brother, John Armstrong.

See also
 Province of Pennsylvania

References

Granville
Granville
Granville
Mifflin County, Pennsylvania
Pre-statehood history of Pennsylvania